SMZ may refer to:

As an abbreviation:
 Sulfamethazine, an antibiotic whose abbreviations include SMZ
 Sulfamethoxazole, an antibiotic whose abbreviations include SMZ
 Silver Mt. Zion, root of the many names of a Canadian band abbreviated SMZ
 Saber Marionette Z, fictional manga/anime character in Saber Marionette
 South Manchuria Railway Zone, in China, abbreviated SMR, also called SMZ
 SMZ connector, a miniature-type RF connector
 Stoomvaart Maatschappij Zeeland (1875–1989), ship company now owned by Stena Line Holland BV
 Serpukhovskiy Moto Zavod (Serpukov Motor Factory), Russian factory of SeAZ's SZ cycle-car
 Southern Marginal Zone, in South Africa and Zimbabwe, part of the Limpopo Belt
 Schloegl Mang Zender (SMZ 250), a machine designed for motorcycle racer Anton Mang

As a code:
 Stoelmans Eiland Airstrip, an airport in Surinam, IATA code SMZ
 RAF Scampton, a Royal Air Force station in the UK, ICAO airline designator SMZ
 Sarai Mir, a town and railway station in India, station code SMZ
 Sisak–Moslavina County (Sisačko-Moslavačka Županija), in Croatia, locally abbreviated SMZ
 Simeku language or Simeku, a South Bougainville language (East Papua), ISO 639-3 language code smz

See also
 Co-trimoxazole, an antibiotic abbreviated TMP-SMX, also called TMP-SMZ